Defending champions Cyril Suk and Helena Suková defeated Andrei Olhovskiy and Larisa Neiland in the final, 4–6, 6–3, 6–4 to win the mixed doubles tennis title at the 1997 Wimbledon Championships.

Seeds

  Grant Connell /  Lindsay Davenport (semifinals)
  Patrick Galbraith /  Lisa Raymond (second round)
  Andrei Olhovskiy /  Larisa Neiland (final)
  Cyril Suk /  Helena Suková (champions)
  Rick Leach /  Manon Bollegraf  (quarterfinals)
  Sandon Stolle /  Mary Joe Fernández (second round)
  David Adams /  Alexandra Fusai (third round)
  Mark Knowles /  Anna Kournikova (second round, withdrew)
  Joshua Eagle /  Caroline Vis (first round)
  Donald Johnson /  Linda Wild (second round)
  Libor Pimek /  Sabine Appelmans (first round)
  Jim Grabb /  Debbie Graham (first round)
  Luke Jensen /  Katrina Adams (second round)
  Pablo Albano /  Mercedes Paz (second round)
  Mahesh Bhupathi /  Rika Hiraki (third round)
  Alex O'Brien /  Corina Morariu (second round)

Draw

Finals

Top half

Section 1

Section 2

Bottom half

Section 3

Section 4

References

External links

1997 Wimbledon Championships on WTAtennis.com
1997 Wimbledon Championships – Doubles draws and results at the International Tennis Federation

X=Mixed Doubles
Wimbledon Championship by year – Mixed doubles